Following is the list of 2007 Copa Sudamericana final stages.

The 2007 edition of the Copa Sudamericana was played by 34 teams; 30 teams from the CONMEBOL and 4 teams from the CONCACAF. CONMEBOL organized the tournament and invited three North American clubs which were the best three of the CONCACAF Champions' Cup 2007; the fourth North American club was the defending champion Pachuca. The official draw took place on 22 May in Buenos Aires.

Round of 16

First leg

Second leg

Arsenal won 3–2 on aggregate.

Vasco da Gama won 3–2 on aggregate.

2–2 on aggregate. São Paulo won on away goals.

River Plate won 4–3 on aggregate.

2–2 on aggregate. Guadalajara won on away goals.

América won 4–3 on aggregate.

Defensor won 3–2 on aggregate.

2–2 on aggregate. Millonarios won 7–6 on penalties.

Quarter-finals

First legs

Second legs

América won 2–1 on aggregate.

Millonarios won 3–0 on aggregate.

River Plate 2–2 Defensor on aggregate. River Plate won on away goals.

Arsenal won 3–1 on aggregate.

Semi-finals

0–0 on aggregate. Arsenal won 4–2 on penalties.

Finals

References

External links
 Match Report Index at Official Site 

final stages